University of Business Innovation and Sustainability (UBIS University) is a private business school founded in 2006 in Geneva, Switzerland. The schools offers programs globally with international campuses in Geneva, Switzerland as well as Barcelona, Spain. UBIS is currently headquartered in Washington DC, United States. 

UBIS University is an internationally accredited private institute and is part of the U.S. investment and advisory firm Hamilton White. The institute offers courses in English: Bachelor's and Master's degrees in Business Administration and International Relations, Doctorate in Business Administration plus Industry Specific Certificate programs in International Organization, Banking and Financial Services, and Cleantech as well as Corporate Training, and enrolls students and program participants from 40 countries. All programs are offered on the ground at the international campuses in Geneva, Switzerland and Barcelona Spain as well as 100% online or blended (online and on-campus); students in the dual (Swiss/U.S.) programs will receive a Swiss diploma as well as an American diploma.

UBIS University's programs are based on the U.S. standards and the Bologna accord standards. The dual degrees are granted via the partnership with sister universities around the globe.

Accreditation  

UBIS programs are accredited by 

Higher Education Licensure Commission (Washington DC)

IACBE.[2] 

Counsil on Higher Education Accreditation

EDUQUA

Memberships & certifications

UBIS is a  member of the European Foundation for Management Development (EFMD).

UBIS is certified by ISO 21001:2018 quality standard, which certifies training services through education and non-formal learning.

University Partners

As of 2022, 13 countries' universities are in partnership with UBIS. 

Azerbaijan - Baku State University, Baku Higher Oil School 3, Western Caspian University, and Universitasinternational.
France - ASENCIA.
Kazakhstan - Business School Kazguu and ESIL University.
Malaysia - Aimsmet Executive Education.
Maldives - Maldives Business School.
Nigeria - AfriHUB – GDLI.
Spain - Universidad Católica de Valencia.
Switzerland - Universidad Geneva School of Diplomacy.
United Arab Emirates - WKMDC & London American City College.
United States - University of the Potomac and Manhattan Institute of Management.
United Kingdom - Eurasia Educational Dynamics (EED).
Vietnam - ASEAN Education Development Program (AEDP), IDEAS – Institute Development and Exchange for Applied Science (Previously IBM), International Pacific Institute (IPI) – Da Nang, and Vietnam Business Process Outsourcing (VBPO) – Da Nang.
Kyrgyzstan - Kyrgyz Economics University (KEU).

Academic programs 

UBIS University's programs are based on the U.S. standards and the Bologna accord standards. The dual degrees are granted via the partnership with sister universities around the globe.

For bachelor's, UBIS offers Bachelor of Business Administration (BBA) and Bachelor of Arts in International Relations (BA-IR). 

For master's, UBIS offers Master of Arts in International Relations (MA-IR), Master of Business Administration (MBA), Master of Science in Information Technology (MS-IT), and Executive Master of Science in Information Technology (EMS-IT).

For doctorate, it offers Doctorate of Business Administration (DBA) and Executive Doctorate of Business Administration (EDBA).

Micro-Credentials

UBIS also offers the following micro-credentials courses:

Information technology - Cybersecurity, IT Management Control and Audit, Web/Mobile Design and Development, and Data Science.
Business - Executive Management, Finance and Banking, Business Sustainability and Ethics, Information Technology Management, International Business, Digital Entrepreneurship, and Project Management Professional.
MBA - Core Enterprise Functions, Leadership and Sustainability, and Business Strategy and Analytics.

International programs 

The institute offers courses on the ground at its urban campus in Geneva as well as online. UBIS University has established partnerships with universities in the United States, Europe, Asia, and Africa, such as: University of the Potomac, Geneva School of Diplomacy, Baku Higher Oil School, Baku State University, Western Caspian University, 

Bachelor of Business Administration
Bachelor in International Relations
Master of Business Administration
Masters of Arts in International Relations (MAIR)
Doctorate of Business Administration (DBA)

References 

Business schools in Switzerland
Schools in Geneva
Educational institutions established in 2006
2006 establishments in Switzerland